Bismullah v. Gates is a writ of habeas corpus appeal in the United States Justice System, on behalf of Bismullah (Guantanamo detainee 968)—an Afghan detainee held by the United States in the Guantanamo Bay detention camps, in Cuba.  It was one of over 200 habeas corpus petitions filed on behalf of detainees held in the Guantanamo Bay detention camp in Cuba.

Rasul v. Bush

Initially, the Bush Presidency
asserted that none of the captives apprehended during the "global war on terror" were protected by the Geneva Conventions.  The Bush Presidency asserted that the Guantanamo Bay Naval Base was not United States territory, and that it was not subject to United States law.  Consequently, they challenged that the captives were entitled to submit writs of habeas corpus.

The Supreme Court of the United States ruled, in Rasul v. Bush, that the Guantanamo base was covered by US law.

Hearing before the DC Court of appeals

The United States Court of Appeals for the District of Columbia Circuit reached a decision in Bismullah v. Gates on July 20, 2007.

The three judge panel ruled that Guantanamo captive's attorneys should be allowed to review all the classified evidence in their client's dossier.

On September 1, 2007, the United States Department of Justice requested a rehearing en banc of Bismullah v. Gates.
The Department of Justice's request stated:

Senior members of the US intelligence establishment went on record to support the Department of Justice's request for a re-hearing.
The five senior official filed documents supporting the Department of Justice request on September 7, 2007—six days before the deadline expired.
Two of the five documents were classified secret.

CIA Director Michael V. Hayden wrote:

References

External links

United States habeas corpus case law
Guantanamo captives' habeas corpus petitions